Toshimasa is a masculine Japanese given name.

Possible writings
Toshimasa can be written using many different combinations of kanji characters. Some examples:

敏正, "agile, righteous"
敏雅, "agile, elegant"
敏昌, "agile, clear"
敏政, "agile, politics"
敏将, "agile, commander"
敏真, "agile, reality"
敏匡, "agile, reform"
俊正, "talented, righteous"
俊雅, "talented, elegant"
俊昌, "talented, clear"
俊政, "talented, politics"
俊将, "talented, commander"
俊真, "talented, reality"
俊匡, "talented, reform"
利正, "benefit, righteous"
利雅, "benefit, elegant"
利昌, "benefit, clear"
利政, "benefit, politics"
利将, "benefit, commander"
利真, "benefit, reality"
年正, "year, righteous"
年昌, "year, clear"
寿正, "long life, righteous"
寿真, "long life, reality"

The name can also be written in hiragana としまさ or katakana トシマサ.

Notable people with the name
Toshimasa Furuta (古田 俊正), Japanese astronomer.
Toshimasa Maeda (前田 利昌, ????–1560), Japanese samurai.
Toshimasa Nanbu (南部 利正, 1751–1784), Japanese samurai and daimyō.
Toshimasa Ota (太田 敏正, born 1973), Japanese journalist.
Toshimasa Shimamura (島村 利正, 1912–1981), Japanese writer.
Toshimasa Toba (鳥羽 俊正, born 1975), Japanese footballer.
Toshimasa Zaonishiki (蔵玉錦 敏正, 1952–2020), real name Toshimasa Adachi (安達 敏正), Japanese sumo wrestler.

Japanese masculine given names